Eusimplex is a genus of moths of the family Noctuidae. The genus was erected by Emilio Berio in 1977. Both species are found in Zaire.

Species
Eusimplex flava Berio, 1977
Eusimplex perflava Berio, 1977

References

Acontiinae